The Blackduck State Forest is a state forest near the town of Blackduck, located in Beltrami and Itasca counties in Minnesota. It is adjacent to the Buena Vista State Forest and the federally managed Chippewa National Forest. It is managed primarily by the Minnesota Department of Natural Resources and the counties.

The landscape is hilly and mixed soils are a result of the area's glacial history. Aspen and northern hardwoods dominate the upland sites, and black spruce, tamarack, and northern white cedar cover lowland sites.

Outdoor recreation opportunities include cross-country skiing, snowmobiling  and hiking trails. Hunting and picnicking sites are located through the forest, and there is boating access to the Chippewa Forest's waters.

See also
List of Minnesota state forests

External links
Blackduck State Forest - Minnesota Department of Natural Resources (DNR)

References

Minnesota state forests
Protected areas of Beltrami County, Minnesota
Protected areas of Itasca County, Minnesota
Protected areas established in 1935
1935 establishments in Minnesota